The 1920–21 season was the 44th Scottish football season in which Dumbarton competed at national level, entering the Scottish Football League and the Scottish Cup.  In addition Dumbarton entered the Dumbartonshire Cup and the Dumbartonshire Charity Cup.

Scottish League

Dumbarton witnessed a slump in form finishing in 21st-place out of 22, with 24 points, well behind champions Rangers. In addition to an outflow of some of the team's talent, the inability to score was also a problem, and with just 41 goals to their credit, Dumbarton finishing up as lowest scorers in the league.

Promotion/relegation Election
The bottom two clubs - Dumbarton and St Mirren - retained their places in the Scottish League.  Although the Scottish Second Division had not yet reformed, there was one applicant for promotion - Central League champions, Dunfermline Athletic.  However they failed to find a proposer and seconder in the vote.

Scottish Cup

Dumbarton reached the fourth round before losing out to Rangers.

Dumbartonshire Cup
Dumbarton again failed to progress from the sectional stage of the Dumbartonshire Cup.

Final league table

Dumbartonshire Charity Cup
Following a draw with Vale of Leven in the semi final, a replay date could not be arranged and Dumbarton agreed to scratch from the competition.

Friendlies

Player statistics

Squad 

|}

Source:

Transfers

Players in

Players out 

Source:

References

Dumbarton F.C. seasons
Scottish football clubs 1920–21 season